Jaxon Smith-Njigba (born February 14, 2002) is an American football wide receiver for the Ohio State Buckeyes. He holds the FBS Bowl Game and Ohio State single game record for most receiving yards with 347 in the 2022 Rose Bowl. Smith also holds Ohio State records for most catches in a single game with 15 (twice) and most receiving yards in a single season with 1,606 during the 2021 season.

Early life and high school career
Smith-Njigba grew up in Rockwall, Texas, and attended Rockwall High School. Smith-Njigba led all high school football players in the Dallas–Fort Worth metroplex with 97 receptions for 1,828 yards and 20 touchdowns in his junior season. As a senior, he caught 104 passes for 2,094 yards and 35 touchdowns and was named the recipient of both the Landry Award and the Texas Gatorade Football Player of the Year award. Smith-Njigba played in the 2019 All-American Bowl and was named a high school All-American by Sports Illustrated and USA Today. Smith-Njigba finished his high school career with 5,346 career receiving yards and 82 touchdowns in 44 games played. A 5 star prospect and the #5 ranked wide receiver in the nation, Smith-Njigba received offers from many top college football programs including Notre Dame, Nebraska and Ole Miss.  Ultimately, however, he committed to  Ohio State University.

College career
Smith-Njigba played in seven games as a freshman and led Ohio State's freshmen with 10 receptions for 49 yards and one touchdown.

He was named a starter at the slot receiver position for the Buckeyes going into his sophomore season. On November 6, 2021, Smith-Njigba recorded 15 receptions (single game school record) for 240 yards (the second most receiving yards in a game in school history at the time) and one touchdown in a 26–17 win against Nebraska. Later that season, he set both an Ohio State single game and FBS Bowl record for receiving yards with 347 in Ohio State's win in the 2022 Rose Bowl. In that game, he also recorded 15 receptions (tying his own record set in the aforementioned Nebraska game) and passed David Boston for the single season receiving yards record at Ohio State with 1,606.

Smith-Njigba was limited to just three games in 2022 due to a hamstring injury and his decision to not participate in the College Playoff.

Statistics

Personal life
Smith-Njigba is of half Sierra Leonean descent. Smith-Njigba's older brother, Canaan Smith-Njigba, plays for the Pittsburgh Pirates of Major League Baseball (MLB).

References

External links
Ohio State Buckeyes bio

2002 births
Living people
People from Rockwall, Texas
Players of American football from Texas
American football wide receivers
Ohio State Buckeyes football players
American people of Sierra Leonean descent
Sportspeople of Sierra Leonean descent